Lúcia Murat (born 1949 in Rio de Janeiro) is a Brazilian filmmaker.

Murat participated in the student and guerrilla movements against the military dictatorship in Brazil in the 1960–1970s. She was imprisoned and tortured by military agents; that experience exerted a strong influence on her work. Murat worked as a journalist for newspapers like Jornal do Brasil and O Globo before becoming a film director.

Her feature film Que Bom Te Ver Viva is a compendium of stories and memories of her and other political prisoners. In 2004, she returned to the theme with Quase Dois Irmãos, winning the Best Ibero-American Film Award at the Mar del Plata Festival.

In 2011, Murat won several prizes at the Gramado Festival with the film A Long Journey.

Filmography 
 O Pequeno Exército Louco (1984)
 Que Bom Te Ver Viva (1989)
 Oswaldianas (1992) (segment "Daisy das Almas Deste Mundo")
 Doces Poderes (1997)
 Brave New Land (Brava Gente Brasileira) (2000)
 Almost Brothers  (Quase Dois Irmãos) (2004)
 Olhar Estrangeiro (2006)
 Maré, Nossa História de Amor (2007)
 A Long Journey (Uma Longa Viagem) (2011)
 A memória que me contam (2013) 
 Praça Paris (2017)

References

External links
 

Living people
1949 births
Brazilian film directors
Brazilian women film directors
People from Rio de Janeiro (city)
Brazilian people of Turkish descent